Bissetia tauromma is a moth in the family Crambidae. It was described by A. P. Kapur in 1950. It is found in the Punjab region of what was British India.

References

Haimbachiini
Moths described in 1950